The Outer Ring Road, officially as, Jawaharlal Nehru Outer Ring Road and abbreviated as, O.R.R., is a 158 kilometer, 8-lanes ring road expressway encircling Hyderabad, capital of the Indian state of Telangana. The expressway is designed for speeds up to 100 km/h. A large part, 124 km (covering urban nodes viz., Hi- Tech city, Nanakramguda Financial District, Rajiv Gandhi International Airport, IKP Knowledge park, Hardware Park, Telangana State Police Academy, Singapore Financial District, and Games village) of the 158-km was opened by December 2012.

It gives an easy connectivity between NH 44, NH 65, NH 161, NH 765 and NH 163 from Hyderabad to Vijayawada and Warangal as well as state highways leading to Vikarabad Nagarjuna Sagar and Karimnagar /Mancherial. The Outer Ring Road also helps in reducing the travel time from Rajiv Gandhi International Airport to cities like Nizamabad & Adilabad as it connects to NH44. The expressway is fenced and 33 radial roads connect it with the Inner Ring Road, and the upcoming Regional Ring Road.

History
Initially this project was taken up by HUDA (Hyderabad Urban Development Authority), through its internal funding without political intervention of state government. In December 2022, Government of Telangana planned to monetise the outer ring road through the toll-operate-transfer (TOT) model and generate revenues and called for tenders.

Route map

Exit & Entry Junctions

There are 20 interchange junctions on the Outer Ring Road.

 Kokapet interchange
Shamshabad Junction
 Telangana State Police Academy Junction (TSPA Junction)
 Nanakramguda Junction
 Gachibowli Junction
  Muttangi Junction, Pantancheru
 Dommarapochampalli Junction
 Kandlakoya Junction, Medchal (NH44) Nagpur highway (Srinagar to Kanyakumari National Highway) 
 Shamirpet Junction(SH1) Karimnagar State Highway 
 Keesara Junction
 Annojiguda Junction, Ghatkesar
 Pedda Amberpet Junction
 Bongloor Junction

The ORR passes through the villages in Ranga Reddy and Sangareddy districts viz. Ghatkesar, Shamshabad, Tukkuguda, Kollur, Narsingi, Gachibowli, Patancheru, Bowrampet, Gowdavelli, Shamirpet, Pedda Amberpet, Bongloor and Medchal.

Traffic studies

The traffic studies on NH 44 and NH 65 concluded that a 4/6 lane road is due. The traffic movement on the existing inner ring road proved that the existing 4-lane road was inadequate. Due to the anticipated growth in the region and the development of proposed satellite townships around the ring road and beyond, an 8-lane carriageway was planned with a design life of 20 years.

The conclusion was to develop a highway with access control provides highway grade separations or interchanges for all intersecting highways. Once it had been decided to develop the route as an expressway, all intersecting highways should be terminated, rerouted or provided with a grade separation. The proposed corridor was access-controlled and limited access was to be provided at National Highway/SHI Major road crossings. A 2-lane service roads designed to carry two-way traffic, were proposed on both sides of the corridor. Low level underpasses were to be provided for connecting both the service roads at every 1–2 km, where the terrain permits.

Opening timeline
 14 Nov 2008: Gachibowli – Narsingi – Shamshabad (for Hyderabad International Airport) (22 km)
 07 Jul 2010: Shamshabad – Pedda Amberpet (38 km)
 14 Aug 2011: Narsingi – Patancheru (23.7 km)
 03 Dec 2012: (part completed in 27 April 2018) Patancheru – Gowdavalli, and Kandlakoya – Shamirpet (38 km)
 04 Mar 2015: Pedda Amberpet – Ghatkesar (14 km)
 15 Jul 2016:  Ghatkesar – Shameerpet (23 km)

Land Acquisition
The estimated Cost of Acquisition was ₹250 Crores.

Cycling track
Government of Telangana is constructing a 23 km long cycle track on the Outer Ring Road (ORR) between the main carriageway and service road. The foundation stone was laid by the Minister for Municipal Administration and Urban Development (MAUD) K. T. Rama Rao in September 2022. The cycle track is 8.5 km long from Nanakramguda Juntion to the Telangana State Police Academy (TSPA) and 14.50 km from Narsingi to Kollur covered with solar panel rooftops along the stretch with a capacity of 16 MW. The width of the cycle track is 4.5 metres with one-metre green space on either side. The cycle track is the improved version of the South Korean model, which provides more facilities like lighting, protection from rain, parking and other amenities such as food stalls. A team of officials from HMDA and HGCL had visited South Korea and studied the Cycle Track Project between Daejon and Sejong.

Gallery

Criticism
Much before the outer ring road (ORR) became a ring road, it underwent several changes in the road alignments. Influential farmers and realtors changed the alignment to best serve their interests at the cost of small and marginal farmers.

The High Court of Andhra Pradesh passed a landmark judgement on 9 September 2010 in which the land acquisition proceedings were quashed for various reasons.

See also 

Unified Metropolitan Transportation Authority, Hyderabad (India)
Inner Ring Road, Hyderabad
Regional Ring Road
Radial Roads, Hyderabad (India)
Elevated Expressways in Hyderabad
Intermediate Ring Road, Hyderabad (India)
Outer Ring Road, Bangalore

References

External links

Roads in Hyderabad, India
Ring roads in India
Expressways in Telangana